Bygg Mats Patric Mabergs (born 18 February 1992 in Malung) is a Swedish curler.

He is a 2014 European mixed curling champion and a two-time Swedish mixed curling champion (2014, 2017).

Teams

Men's

Mixed

Personal life
His younger sister is Swedish, European and Olympic curler champion Sofia Mabergs.

References

External links

Living people
1992 births
People from Malung-Sälen Municipality
Swedish male curlers
European curling champions
Swedish curling champions
Universiade medalists in curling
Universiade silver medalists for Sweden
Competitors at the 2015 Winter Universiade
Competitors at the 2017 Winter Universiade
21st-century Swedish people